A manualist is a person who does:
Manualism (hand music)
Sign Language
Manual communication
Signing Exact English
French Sign Language